Niccolò Galli is the name of:

Niccolò Galli (footballer, born 1983), footballer
Niccolò Galli (footballer, born 1988), current footballer